The Chinese Ambassador to Palestine is the official representative of the People's Republic of China to the State of Palestine.

History 
In December 1995, China opened its office of representation to the Palestinian National Authority in Gaza. In May 2004, the office moved to Ramallah.

List of representatives

References

See also
 Ambassadors of China

Palestina
China–State of Palestine relations
China